Ditangium is a genus of fungi in the family Sebacinaceae. Species form gelatinous basidiocarps (fruitbodies) on wood, often with similarly gelatinous anamorphs (asexual states). The former were previously referred to the genus Craterocolla, whilst the latter were referred to Ditangium. Following changes to the International Code of Nomenclature for algae, fungi, and plants, the practice of giving different names to teleomorph and anamorph forms of the same fungus was discontinued, meaning that Craterocolla became a synonym of the earlier name Ditangium.

References

External links

Sebacinales